Guru Gobind Singh Hospital (GGSH) is located in Patna City (Patna Sahib), Patna. The hospital has been attached by the state health administration to the AIIMS Patna till the latter's complex to accommodate patients comes up in 2014. Patna high court directed to construct a boundary wall for the hospital spread on 68-acre at an estimated cost of Rs. 1.87 crore.

See also
 List of places named after Guru Gobind Singh
 Takht Sri Patna Sahib
 Patna Sahib railway station
 Patna Sahib (Lok Sabha constituency)

References

Hospitals in Patna
Memorials to Guru Gobind Singh
1935 establishments in India
Hospitals established in 1935